The two-spot lizardfish (Synodus binotatus) is a species of lizardfish that lives mainly in the Indo-Pacific Ocean.

Information
The two-spot lizardfish is known to be found in a marine environment within a reef-associated area.

The two-spot lizardfish is native to a tropical climate. The distribution of this species is known to be found in the areas of Indo-Pacific, Gulf of Aden, East Africa, Hawaiian and Gambier islands, north to the Ogasawara Islands, and south to the Great Barrier Reef. This species is known to occur in coral reefs. It is common to find this species on hard surfaces with their heads down on the slope. They also stay solitary and not within a group. This species can be found in markets sold fresh for food. It is known to be harmless and not serve as any threat to humans.

Common names
The common names for the two-spot lizardfish in different languages include the following:
Ulae : Hawaiian
Anoli à deux taches : French 
Bubule : Tagalog
Jebak : Marshall
Jebak : Marshallese (Kajin M̧ajeļ)
Kalaso : Tagalog
Kolneus-akkedisvis : Afrikaans
lagarto dos manchas : Spanish
Mo'o 'anae : Tahitian (Reo Mā`ohi)
Niten-eso : Japanese (日本語)
Peixe-banana de manchas : Portuguese 
Spotnose lizardfish : English
Ta'oto : Samoan (gagana fa'a Samoa)
Tiki-tiki : Tagalog
Tiki-tiki : Visayan
Toplettet øglefisk : Danish 
Two-spot lizard fish : English
Twospot lizardfish : English
wutimate : Fijian (vosa Vakaviti)
吻斑狗母魚 : Mandarin Chinese
吻斑狗母鱼 : Mandarin Chinese
狗母 : Mandarin Chinese

References

Notes

External links
 Fishes of Australia : Synodus binotatus
 

two-spot lizardfish
Fish of Hawaii
Marine fish of Northern Australia
two-spot lizardfish